Gordon Matthews may refer to:

 Gordon Matthews (inventor) (1936–2002), American inventor and businessman
 Gordon Matthews (politician) (1908–2000), British chartered accountant and politician